2nd Rifle Division can refer to:

 2nd Rifle Division (Poland)
 2nd Rifle Division (Soviet Union)
 2nd Siberian Rifle Division